Kate Chilcott is a road cyclist from New Zealand. She participated at the 2012 UCI Road World Championships.

References

External links
 profile at Procyclingstats.com

New Zealand female cyclists
Living people
Place of birth missing (living people)
Year of birth missing (living people)